The Legend of the Condor Heroes is a Hong Kong television series adapted from Louis Cha's novel of the same title. The series was first broadcast on TVB Jade in 1994.

This series with rating of 32 Points.

Cast
 Note: Some of the characters' names are in Cantonese romanisation.

 Julian Cheung as Kwok Ching
 Chu Wai-lin as young Kwok Ching
 Athena Chu as Wong Yung
 Gallen Lo as Yeung Hong
 Emily Kwan as Muk Nim-chi
 Lau Dan as Hung Tsat-kung
 Felix Lok as Wong Yeuk-see
 Wayne Lai as Chow Pak-tung
 Chu Tit-wo as Au-yeung Fung
 Newton Lai as Yat-dang
 Dominic Lam as Yeung Tit-sam
 Savio Tsang as Kwok Siu-tin
 Iwanbeo Leung as Bau Si-yeuk
 Ng Lai-ju as Lee Ping
 Wong Wai as Yuen-ngan Hung-lit
 Lau Kong as Genghis Khan
 Ben Wong as Tolui
 Chor Kin-ban as young Tolui
 Chan Pui-san as Wah-tsang
 Chor See-pui as young Wah-tsang
 Poon Man-bak as Jochi
 Ho Kam-ling as Chagatai
 Doi Siu-man as Ogodei
 Ho Ho-yuen as Jebe
 Lee Wai-man as Bok-yee-shu
 Lee Hoi-sang as Pang Elder
 Cheung Hung-wai as Bok-yee-fat
 Lee Wong-sang as Muqali
 Tsui Bo-hin as Chek-lo-wan
 Lau Kwai-fong as Genghis Khan's wife
 Leung Siu-tik as Song-kwan
 Chun Hung as Jamukha
 Tam Yat-ching as Wang Khan
 Wong Wai-tak as Do-see
 Chan Chi-ho as young Do-see
 Mak Tsui-han as Mui Chiu-fung
 Joe Ma as Chan Yuen-fung
 Lam Sheung-mou as Yau Chui-kai
 Kong Chor-fai as Ma Yuk
 Chan Wing-chun as Wong Chui-yat
 Yu Mo-lin as Suen Bat-yee
 Gordon Lam as Wan Chi-ping
 Leung Yam-kei as Lau Chui-yuen
 Yip Chan-wah as Tam Chui-tsui
 Law Wai as Ho Dai-tung
 Kwok Tak-shun as Wong Chung-yeung
 Kong Ngai as Or Chan-ngok
 Ngai Wai as Chu Cung
 Wong Tin-chak as Hon Bo-kui
 Cheng Kah-sang as Nam Hei-yan
 Bok Kwan as Chuen Kam-fat
 Lee Yiu-king as Cheung Ah-sang
 Chan On-ying as Hon Siu-ying
 Lam Wai as Au-yeung Hak
 Kit Chan as Sor-ku
 Cheung Man-shui as Lau Ying
 Hung Chiu-fung as Kau Chin-yan
 Wong Seng-seung as Wong Dou-hin
 Lui Kin-kong as Koi Wan-cung
 Kwan Ching as Yuen-ngan Hong-hei
 Ho Pik-kin as Kiu-muk
 Chan Jui as Ching Yiu-ka
 Fong Kit as Luk Sing-fung
 Kwok Ching-hung as Luk Koon-ying
 Luk Ying-hong as Kui Ling-fung
 Kiu Hung as How Tung-hoi
 Chan Tik-hak as Sa Tung-tin
 Tang Yuk-wing as Leung Tsi-yung
 Mak Tsi-wan as Pang Lin-fu
 Cho Kai as Ling-chi Seung-yan
 Chan Min-leung as Lo Yau-kiuk
 Mak Ho-wai as Tong Cho-tak
 Wong Yat-fei as Duen Tin-tak

Reception
Although viewership ratings did not exceed the 1983 version, 
This series with an average viewership rating of 32 points.

References

External links

|align="center" colspan="4"|Before:Fate of the Last Empire - May 6
|align="center" colspan="4"|TVB Jade First line series 1994The Legend of the Condor HeroesOctober 3 - December 2
|align="center" colspan="4"|Next:Love CycleDecember 5 -

TVB dramas
1994 Hong Kong television series debuts
1994 Hong Kong television series endings
Television shows based on The Legend of the Condor Heroes
Television series set in the Southern Song
Television series set in the Jin dynasty (1115–1234)
Television series set in the Mongol Empire
Hong Kong wuxia television series
Depictions of Genghis Khan on television
Television shows set in Hangzhou
Cantonese-language television shows